Sue Munson is a Surrey-based English artist.

Biography
Born in England Munson has travelled extensively and uses travel and observation as a means to supplement her knowledge of art. She has studied in North America, and during the nineties travelled to India to study textiles. It was during this time Munson made the switch from working on fabric to working on other supports to express her ideas. Her work has been largely experimental taking inspiration from the great mark makers of the 20th century.

Style and Mediums
Munson’s work focuses on the dichotomy of human nature. The abstract represents the fun, free almost noisy side of the brain, while the minimal represents a more contemplative approach. Within these two genres a dialogue takes place, interpretation of which is left to the viewer.

Although conveying simplicity, Munson’s paintings are built in layers, using acrylics, sprays and pens but making very little use of brushes. Paintings are worked on canvas, archival board or paper. Munson’s latest work pays tribute to Family Domesticity, and Friendship, and the art of keeping it simple. Munson is an advocate of continuous learning, and offers inspiration through her workshops and study days.

Exhibitions
Current:
 Current minimal work can be viewed at Dynamite Gallery Brighton.
 Four Walls Art Hove East Sussex
 Amanda Aldous Fine Art Hampshire
 Arundel Contemporary, 53 High Street, Arundel, BN18 9AJ

Past:
Royal West of England Academy Open 2018
Porthmeor Studios September 2018
Sunbury Gallery - Diverse PalletsRoyal Academy Sumer Exhibition 2017
Flux Exhibition Chelsea 2017
 Flux, Brick Lane (November 2016)
 The Barge Warehouse, Southbank
 Royal Academy Summer Exhibition 2015
 Royal Academy Summer Exhibition 2016
 Draw To Abstraction, Orleans House Gallery
 The Affordable Art Fair, Battersea
 Cork Street Open Exhibition (2011,2012,2013
 McAllister Thomas Gallery (2011,2012)
 Chelsea Arts Fair* Chelsea Arts Society
 Society of Women Artists (2010)
 The Walled Garden Gallery, Sunbury-On-Thames
 The Charles Street Gallery, Beaufort South Carolina
 Spring Island Showcase, South Carolina
 The Royal West of England Academy Open Exhibition
 Battersea Arts Fair
 Caveleiro Finn, Herne Hill

References

External links
 Official Sue Munson Website

1949 births
Living people
English women artists